Mahibadhoo Sports Club is an association football club based in Mahibadhoo, Maldives. The club competes in Second Division, the second tier of the Maldives football league system.

Club history
The current club was officially established in 2010 but, in previous incarnations, the club's history dates back to early 2000s.
In the 2016 season Mahibadhoo Sports Club were awarded with official membership of the Football Association of Maldives.

Head coaches
 2013:  Ivan Minnaert
 2014:  Mohamed Shiyaz
 2015–:  Yordan Ivanov Stoikov

Honours

League
 Second Division 
Runners-up (promoted via play-off): 2013
 Third Division
Champions: 2007, 2012

References

External links

Football clubs in the Maldives
Dhivehi Premier League clubs